Hay Poco Rock & Roll is the fifth studio album by Spanish rock band Platero y Tú. It was produced by Platero y Tú, recorded in May 1994 and published by DRO on 23 September 1994.

The song "Hay Poco Rock & Roll" is a DLC song in the Rock Band series.

Track listing

Personnel 
 Fito Cabrales: Vocals and guitar.
 Iñaki "Uoho" Antón: Guitar.
 Juantxu Olano: Bass.
 Jesús García: Drums.

Certifications

References

External links 
 Platero y Tú official website (in Spanish)

1994 albums
Platero y Tú albums
Spanish-language albums